Love Mein Ghum (earlier titled Kitni Haseen Hai Zindagi) is a 2011 Pakistani Urdu language romance/musical film, directed and produced by Reema Khan. It stars Moammar Rana, Khan herself, Nabeel Khan and Araida.

The first part of the film was shot in the Azerbaijani city of Baku and the second in Malaysia, making this Khan's second film abroad. Love Mein Ghum was released on 8 July 2011. The film was nominated for the Best Film of the Year 2010 Award at the Pakistan Media Award in 2011.

Cast
 Moammar Rana as Ali
 Reema Khan as Maria Joseph
 Javed Sheikh as Haroon
 Nadeem Baig as Dr. Kanwal
 Ali Saleem 
 Nabeel Khan as Wilson
 Araida Corbol
 Afzal Khan (Jaan Rambo)
 Johnny Lever as Sukhia
 Jia Ali as Sheza

Special appearances 
These celebrities made special appearances in the title song "Love Mein Ghum".
 Sara Loren as herself
 Ayesha Omar as herself
 Azfar Rehman as himself
 Resham as herself
 Meera as herself
 Mona Lizza as herself
 Amanat Ali as himself
 Saleem Sheikh as himself
 Mohib Mirza as himself
 Aamina Sheikh as herself
 Humayun Saeed as himself
 Nadia Hussain as herself
 Maria Wasti as herself
 Adnan Malik as himself
 Ayesha Khan as herself

Production

Filming
The film started shooting in September–October 2008 in Baku, Azerbaijan, while the second part of the film was shot in July 2009 in Malaysia.

Budget
Reema Khan, the director and producer of the film, claimed at the time of release that Love Mein Ghum is the most expensive film to be made in Lollywood. She said in an interview, "I have not compromised on any aspect of the movie, from music to clothes, and from sets to post production, everything is done without compromises, the best available gadgets were used for the movie production and post-production."

Release
The film was released on 31 August 2011. Initially, the film was to be released on Eid ul-Fitr in 2010, but due to the 2010 floods in Pakistan, the release date was postponed. The movie trailer was released in May 2011, and the movie itself released on Eid ul-Fitr.

Box office 
The film was released along with another local multi-starrer film Bhai Log and Salman Khan's Bodyguard. According to media reports published by Dawn, the film was doing reasonably well at the box office, but not as much as its two competitors though. Outside the old Metropole cinema in Lahore, huge crowds showed up for the premiere of the film. Despite having impressive opening, the film was declared a box office failure, as all these three films were being screened simultaneously at multiplexes, which media suggested was a substantive factor in the film's disappointing box office returns. Talking about the film during an interview in 2016, Reema Khan stated that the film's box office performance shattered her: ''My heart was so broken that only a doctor could fix it.''

Critical reception 
Rafay Mahmood, reviewing the film for The Express Tribune stated ''The film as a whole is under-directed and under-performed with some of the legends of Pakistani cinema being wasted in their roles. Abbas Hussain, also from The Express Tribune Blogs wrote ''In a nutshell, the film is old Lollywood wine in a brand new sleek bottle that has the unique ability to unintentionally entertain in its serious moments while simultaneously irritate to the point of making one's teeth and fists clench.''

Music
Love Mein Ghum's original music is by M. Arshad, Najat Ali, Ravi Bal, Waqar Ali and Huntar and the lyrics are by Khawaja Pervez, Ahmad Aqeel Ruby and Marz. The singers include Ali Zafar, who sang the title song of the film, and Abrar-ul-Haq with "Sohniye – Heeriye", Kailash Kher and Shazia Manzoor for the song "Sohniye Yaadan", composed and produced by Ravi Bal, Sunidhi Chauhan and Hunter's for "Aila Aila", Rahat Fateh Ali Khan and Shaan. Pappu Samrat is the choreographer.

Track listing

See also
 Lists of Pakistani films
 Pakistani films of 2011
 Cinema of Pakistan

References

External links
 

Pakistani romance films
2010s Urdu-language films
2011 films
Films shot in Azerbaijan
Films shot in Malaysia
Films directed by Reema Khan